Penicillium ornatum is an anamorph species of the genus Penicillium.

References

Further reading 
 

ornatum
Fungi described in 1968